"Soro Soke" is a political slogan and Internet meme that was used by EndSARS protests. Soro Soke is a Yoruba word meaning speak up.

History 
The slogan was first used during the EndSARS protest.

In popular culture 
In 2022, Sọ̀rọ̀sókè: an #EndSARS anthology was edited by Jumoke Verissimo and James Yeku, and Soro Soke: The Young Disruptors Of An African MegaCity was authored by Trish Lorenz and published by Cambridge University Press, which sparked criticism when the author claimed to have invented the word Soro Soke.

References 

Chants
Euphemisms
Internet memes introduced in 2020
Mass media issues
Political Internet memes